Urocerus albicornis (white-horned horntail) is a species of horntail native to North America. This species occasionally introduced into European countries and Japan.

References

Siricidae